Belly of the Beast is a 2003 action film starring Steven Seagal.

Belly of the Beast may also refer to:

Literature
In the Belly of the Beast, a 1981 book by Jack Abbott
In the Belly of the Beast, a 1989 comic book in the Terminator series
The Belly of the Beast, issue #1 (published in 1992) of the comic book series Mouse Guard
Belly of De Beast, a 1996 album by poet-writer Benjamin Zephaniah
Way Down Deep in the Belly of the Beast: A Memoir, a 1996 memoir by George Fetherling
Belly of the Beast, a 1997 issue of the comic book series Sam & Max
"In the Belly of the Beast", a 1999 short story by William King (author)
"In the Belly of the Beast", a 2006 chapter of the manga Fullmetal Alchemist
Mythos Tales #1: Belly of the Beast, a 2011 book in the Savage Worlds series
Addicted: Notes From the Belly of the Beast, a 2016 collection of essays edited by Lorna Crozier and Patrick Lane

Film
The Belly of the Beast, a 2008 film written by and starring Lucius Baston and Jim Fitzpatrick
In the Belly of the Beast, a documentary film about filmmaking, covering the production of several films including A Gun for Jennifer
Belly of the Beast (2020 film), a documentary film by Erika Cohn

Theatre
In the Belly of the Beast, 1983–1985 stage performances based on the book by Jack Henry Abbott, starring William Petersen
Inside the Belly of the Beast, a 1994 short play by Regina Taylor
In the Belly of the Beast Revisited, a 2004 play based on the book by Jack Henry Abbott, performed by the 29th Street Rep

Television
"In the Belly of the Beast", a 1994 episode of the animated television series BattleTech: The Animated Series
"Belly of the Beast", a 1991 episode of the private detective television series Gabriel's Fire with an appearance by Dayton Callie
"Belly of the Beast", a 1993 episode of the television sitcom Coach
"Belly of the Beast", a 1994 episode of the CGI television series ReBoot
"Belly of the Beast", a 1995 episode of the animated children's television series Littlest Pet Shop (1995 TV series)
"Belly of the Beast", a 1997 episode of the teen comedy-drama television series Breaker High
Live from the Belly of the Beast, a 2001 comedy DVD by Joe Rogan
"Belly of the Beast", a 2002 episode of the science fiction television series Andromeda
"Belly of the Beast", a 2006 episode of the animated television series Super Robot Monkey Team Hyperforce Go!
"Belly of the Beast", a 2009 episode of the children's television series Power Rangers
"Into the Belly of the Beast", a 2010 episode of the television drama The Deep (TV serial)
"Belly of the Beast", a 2011 episode of the animated television series Adventure Time (season 2)
"The Belly of the Beast", a 2011 episode of the animated comedy television series Phineas and Ferb
"Belly of the Beast", a 2013 episode of the reality television competition series Ultimate Survival Alaska
"Belly of the Beast", a 2013 episode of the reality cable television series Dual Survival
"In the Belly of the Beast", a 2014 episode of the comedy-drama police procedural television series Castle
"The Belly of the Beast", a 2014 episode of the reality television series Small Town Security
"Belly of the Beast", a 2016 episode of the action television series NCIS: Los Angeles (season 8)
"Belly of the Beast", a 2017 episode of the television drama series Wentworth (season 5)
"Belly of the Beast", a 2017 episode of the horror drama television series The Strain
"Belly of the Beast", a 2017 episode of the period drama television series Turn: Washington's Spies
"Belly of the Beast", a 2017 episode of the animated web television series Skylanders Academy
"Belly of the Beast", a 2017 episode of the comic science fiction video web series Red vs. Blue

Music
"Belly of the Beast", a song on the 1991 album #66064 by Lifers Group
"Belly of the Beast", a song by Anthrax on the 1991 album Persistence of Time
The Belly of the Beasts – Live '91 & '92, an album by Beasts of Bourbon
"Belly of the Beast (Back in Babylon)", a song by Cabaret Voltaire on the 1993 International Language (album)
"Belly of the Beast", a song by Tigertailz on the 1995 album Wazbones
"Belly of the Beast", a song by hip hop artists Sway & King Tech and DJ Revolution on the 1999 album This or That
"Belly of the Beast", a song by Danzig on the 1999 album 6:66 Satan's Child
"Belly of the Beast", a song by Diamond Head on the 2019 album The Coffin Train
"The Belly of the Beast", a song by Eightball and Big Duke on the 1999 Thicker than Water (soundtrack)
Belly of the Beast, a 2006 album by Saigon (rapper)
"Belly of the Beast", a song by The Plastic Constellations on the 2006 Crusades (album)
"Belly of the beast", a song by Lords of the Underground album on the 2007 House of Lords (Lords of the Underground album)
The Return, Part 2: Belly of the Beast, a 2007 album produced by Prophet Entertainment
From the Belly of the Beast, a 2008 album by Villebillies
"Belly of the Beast", a song by the hip hop group Onyx on the 2012 album CUZO
"Belly of the Beast", a song by the hip-hop group Quakers on the 2012 Quakers (album)
"Belly of the Beast", a song by Neil Davidge on the 2012 Halo 4 Original Soundtrack
"Belly of the Beast", a song on the soundtrack of the 2013 fantasy adventure film Percy Jackson: Sea of Monsters
"Belly of the Beast", a song by Gazelle Twin on the 2014 album Unflesh
"Belly of the Beast", a song on the 2014 album Electric Velvet by 3-11 Porter
"Belly of the Beast", a song by Joey Badass on the 2015 album B4.Da.$$
"Belly of the Beast", a song by The Libertines on the 2015 album Anthems for Doomed Youth
"Belly of the Beast", a song on the 2016 album Mellow Diamond by Janel Leppin
"Belly of the Beast", a song by Bernard Fanning on the 2016 album Civil Dusk
"Belly of the Beast", a song by Sixx:A.M. on the 2016 album Prayers for the Damned
"Belly of the Beast", a song composed by James Spanos on the soundtrack of the 2016 action platform video game Until I Have You
Belly of the Beast, a 2017 album by hip hop artist Citizen Kay
"Belly of the Beast", a track released around 2017 by the DJ Mike Saint-Jules
"Belly of the Beast", a song by Big Sanch on the 2019 album Respect the Old Ways.

Other
"Belly of the Beast", a 2014 downloadable mission episode in the video game Sniper Elite III

See also

"Belly of the Beat", a song by Grimes on the 2015 album Art Angels
"The Belly and the Beast", a song by folk singer Anais Mitchell on the 2004 album Hymns for the Exiled